Club Tijuana Xoloitzcuintles de Caliente, commonly known as Tijuana, or simply as Xolos, is a Mexican professional football club based in Tijuana. The club's badge is the founder's (Jorge Hank) hairless xoloitzcuintle, Hermoso. 

Founded on 14 January 2007 as Club Tijuana Xoloitzcuintles de Caliente, the club plays their home games at the Estadio Caliente.

Tijuana has won 1 Liga MX and 1 Ascenso MX championship, as well as 1 Promotional Final.

History
The club is the 2nd latest in a long line of league teams in the city of Tijuana. Gallos Caliente was instituted in the summer of 2006 but it disappeared that same year. Then some businessmen from Tijuana buy the Guerreros de Tabasco and move it to Tijuana, being born like this Club Tijuana Xoloitzcuintles de Caliente. The team and owner announced the construction of the Estadio Caliente, a new stadium with a capacity for 33,333 people near Grupo Caliente's Agua Caliente Racetrack. Jorge Alberto Hank, the son of Jorge Hank Rhon, is the President of the team. They became the Apertura 2012 champions after defeating Toluca 4–2 in a two-legged series.

The team advanced to the Primera División de México with a win at home over Irapuato, 2–1 on May 21, 2011.

Jorge Alberto Hank and Gog Murguia Fernandez, the vice president, became the youngest executives in the history of Mexican professional football to be at the head of a club in the Primera División de México.

The First Title

The team obtained its first title in the Apertura 2010 tournament, after having finished as general leader during the regular tournament, which gave them a direct pass to the semi-finals. In the semi-finals the Xolos faced Albinegros de Orizaba. In both semifinal legs, the Xolos and Albinegros finished 0–0, with the aggregate score 0–0 too. The position that the Xolos had during the regular tournament permitted them to pass to the final against the Tiburones Rojos de Veracruz.
In the first leg the "Xolos" had a surprise win 0–2 in the Estadio Luis "Pirata" Fuente in Veracruz, while in their field they won again 1–0 and this way Tijuana obtained half a ticket towards the Mexican football maximum circuit, the Primera División Mexicana.

Promotion to Liga MX
The final of the Clausura 2011 of the Liga de Ascenso was between Tijuana and Irapuato. The first leg was played on Wednesday May 11 in Tijuana's stadium. The game finished 1–1. The second leg played was in Irapuato, in the Estadio Sergio León Chavez. Irapuato won the game 1–0, being crowned champion of the Clausura 2011 afterwards. With the Tijuana having won the Apertura 2010 title, the Promotion Final was going to be, yet again, Tijuana vs Irapuato. The first leg was played in Irapuato on Wednesday May 18 and it remained 0–0, with the second leg deciding what team was going to be promoted to the Primera División de la Federación Mexicana de Fútbol (now known as Liga MX). Played in Tijuana's Estadio Caliente, the second leg saw the Club Tijuana being crowned champion of the Promotion Final with a result of 2–1. Thus Tijuana replaced the Necaxa as the new Primera Division Team in Mexico.

Liga MX Debut
Kicking off their inaugural season in the Primera Division, Tijuana signed José Sand, Leandro Augusto, Fernando Arce, Egidio Arévalo and Dayro Moreno would move to Tijuana for a fee of US$3.5 m. during summer 2011.

Tijuana opened the 2011–12 season with a 2–1 home loss to Morelia. American Joe Corona scored the club's first top-flight goal in the defeat. They would earn their first victory as a top-flight club in a 3–1 victory at Santos Laguna on August 6; however, after five consecutive home matches without a victory manager Joaquin del Olmo was sacked and replaced by 
Antonio Mohamed.

After having finished the 2011 Apertura with just three wins against nine draws and five losses, Tijuana would have more success in the 2012 Clasura. Behind the league's top defense (allowing just eleven goals in 17 matches), Tijuana finished with seven wins and seven draws against just three defeats and earned their first playoff berth in the top flight, where they would fall to Monterrey.

Apertura 2012 Champions
Xolos would continue their strong defense in the 2012–13 Liga MX season. In the 2012 Apertura, Xolos allowed joint-fewest goals with 15 while finishing tied atop the table with Toluca. Seeded #2 in the La liguilla, they would avenge the previous season's defeat to Monterrey before rallying from a 2–0 deficit against León in the semi-finals. They would win the Liguilla over Toluca with a 4–1 aggregate victory, achieving the title in the shortest time after promotion to the top flight in Mexican history.

Xolos would falter in the Clausura, finishing in 10th place, two points outside of Liguilla qualification. However, invited to Copa Libertadores, Tijuana would make a run to the quarter-finals before falling to Atlético Mineiro.

Stadium

The Estadio Caliente, a multi-use stadium in Tijuana, Baja California, was officially inaugurated on November 11, 2007, in a game between Club Tijuana and Pumas Morelos. The attendance was 13,333, then the stadium capacity. In July 2009, the capacity was increased to 16,000.
Stadium owner Jorge Hank Rhon's main reason for constructing the stadium was his wish to have a professional football club in the city.
Because the Mexican Football Federation says that teams participating in the First Division must have a stadium with a capacity over 15,000, Club Tijuana officially became qualified for promotion to the Primera División de México when the capacity was increased.
The construction of the stadium was planned in two parts. The first part finished the ground and lower sections of the stadium. In the second phase, the stadium's capacity was increased.
Club Xoloitzcuintles added 4,000 seats to its home field of Estadio Caliente, pushing its capacity to 20,000, according to the team's management.
The team also remodeled the players’ dressing rooms and resurfaced the dirt parking lot with a stone surface.
Among the construction projects is the installation of stadium lights, which should not be an issue.

Institutional vision
What first seemed to be a hobby to the football aficionado Jorge Hank Rhon, has now been projected as a business and institution with many ambitions by his son Jorge Alberto Hank Inzunza, President of Club Tijuana, and co-owner Alberto Murguia Orozco. The president has announced several times in press conferences that the project is far bigger than a stadium and a First Division team.
The institutional plan involves football schools and clinics throughout the region, including San Diego and Los Angeles, professional football training, talent recruitment squads; 1st, 2nd, and 3rd division affiliates; foundations and green campaigns, and a heavily invested commercial complex.

Finances and ownership
Controversy surrounded the lease, because the team would have ties to a company whose major business is that of betting on sports events, including football. The case was presented to high authorities in the Mexican Football Federation, where it was ruled that no action would be taken against Xoloitzcuintles De Caliente or its parent company.

Personnel

Current technical staff

Management

Players

First-team squad

Out on loan

Reserve teams

Xolos Hermosillo
Reserve team that plays in the Liga TDP, the fourth level of the Mexican league system.

Kit manufacturers and shirt sponsors

Honours

Domestic competitions
Liga MX: 1
Apertura 2012
Liga de Ascenso: 1
Apertura 2010
Promotional Final: 1
Campeón de Ascenso 2010–11

Friendly competitions

International competitions

Records

Managers

 Víctor Rangel (2007)
 Wilson Graniolatti (2008 – 2009)
 Juan Antonio Luna (2009 – 2010)
 Joaquín del Olmo (2010 – 2011)
 Antonio Mohamed (2011 – 2013)
 Jorge Almirón (2013)
 César Farías (2013 – 2014)
 Daniel Guzmán (2014 – 2015)
 Rubén Omar Romano (2015)
 Raúl Chabrand (2015)
 Miguel Herrera (2015 – 2017) 
 Eduardo Coudet (2017) 
 Diego Cocca (2017 – 2018)
 Oscar Pareja (2018 – 2019)
 Gustavo Quinteros (2020)
 Pablo Guede (2020 – 2021)
 Robert Siboldi (2021)
 Sebastián Méndez (2021 – 2022)
 Ricardo Valiño (2022 – 2023)
 Miguel Herrera (2023 - present)

Women's section
Club Tijuana (Women), founded in 2014, that participated in the US-based Women's Premier Soccer League in the summer and in the Liga Mayor Femenil in the winter.  In their first year, they finished in the middle of the competitive Pac-South division of WPSL before becoming Mexican national champions.
Since 2017 participates in the Liga MX Femenil.

References

External links

Official Club Tijuana site 
Primera División

 
Football clubs in Baja California
Association football clubs established in 2007
Sports teams in Tijuana
Association football in Tijuana
Liga MX teams
Ascenso MX teams